The Delta B, or Thor-Delta B was an American expendable launch system used for nine orbital launches between 1962 and 1964. A derivative of the Thor-Delta, it was a member of the Delta family of rockets.

The first stage was a Thor missile in the DM-21 configuration, and the second stage was the AJ10-118, which was derived from the earlier Delta-A. An Altair solid rocket motor was used as a third stage.

All nine launches occurred from Cape Canaveral Air Force Station Launch Complex 17. Most of the launches carried communications satellites, including Syncom-1 and Syncom-2. Syncom-1 was intended to be the first satellite to be placed into a geosynchronous orbit, however the spacecraft malfunctioned prior to reaching this orbit. Syncom-2 subsequently became the first geosynchronous satellite, and was placed at 55° west of the Greenwich Meridian. The final launch failed due to third stage underperformance, all other launches were successful.

References

Delta (rocket family)